Palang Darreh (also known as Palang Darreh-ye Bālā) is a village in Asgariyeh Rural District, in the Central District of Pishva County, Tehran Province, Iran. At the 2006 census, its population was 260, with 63 families.

References 

Populated places in Pishva County